This is a list of Ice Road Truckers Season 9 episodes.
On July 21, 2015, History announced season 9 would premiere August 2, 2015, at 9/8c.

Episodes 

With the departure of Rowland and VP Express from the series due to a 2014 pickup accident which severely injured him while riding with one of the series’ producers, the "dash for the cash" theme is less emphasized from this season on. As a result, load counts are no longer shown, and the focus shifts to delivering loads to communities as shortening ice road seasons permit, as the season's two-part finale demonstrates.

Returning drivers 
This season features all the truckers from the prior season with the exceptions of Hugh Rowland, Vlad Pleskot and Reno Ward. Debogorski, Dewey and Burke drive for Polar, while Darrell Ward  and Kelly drive for their own company. Barnes appears in episode 8 to help Burke haul a load of fuel.

New driver 
Mike Simmons: Mike is the owner of Bad Apple Escorts, Inc., a pilot truck service based in Edmonton, Alberta. Although he is an experienced heavy hauler on the Alberta oil fields, this season marks his first exposure to ice road trucking. He is hired by Polar to help keep loads moving, in response to the threat of competition posed by Ward and Kelly.

Route and destinations 
Manitoba/Ontario ice roads
Seal River, via cat train convoy from Churchill: Darrell and Mark teamed up to send their best drivers (Dewey and Kelly) to make this haul over the southwest part of Hudson Bay.

References 

2015 American television seasons
Ice Road Truckers seasons